Hoffnungsthal (Valley of Hope) is the location of a former German pioneer settlement, located in South Australia's Barossa Valley.  Founded in 1847, it was located in an ephemeral lagoon which was dry for the first years of settlement.  Local Peramangk people warned the settlers that the area was prone to flooding, but this advice was ignored.  In October 1853, after a week of heavy spring rains, the village was flooded and many of the houses were evacuated.  After the cost of a proposed drain was seen as prohibitive, the village was eventually left deserted.  Most of the settlers moved to the Barossa village of Bethanien as well as further afield.

Built on higher ground, the Lutheran church was still used until 1867, when the building was also abandoned.

In the local Peramangk language, Hoffnungsthal was named Yertalla-ngga (flooding land) and between the years 1917 to 1975, it was called Karawirra as part of the changes to German sounding place names during World War I.

All that remains of the village today are the foundations of the church with a commemorative plaque honouring those buried in the now unmarked cemetery.

Taken from the Beinke Family History Book

See also
 German settlement in Australia
 Barossa German
 European settlement of South Australia

References

Further reading

History of South Australia
Barossa Valley
Ghost towns in South Australia
Populated places established in 1847
1853 disestablishments in Australia
1847 establishments in Australia